Sempati Air was an airline based in Indonesia. Partially owned by friends and family of President Suharto of Indonesia, the airline ceased operations due to bankruptcy after its owner Suharto's May 1998 presidential resignation. Its IATA code has since been reassigned to SpiceJet.

History 

Sempati Air (IATA code: SG; ICAO code: SSR; call sign: Spirow) was founded in December 1968 by PT.Tri Utama Bhakti (PT.Truba) under the name PT Sempati Air Transport and began flights in March of the following year using Douglas DC-3 aircraft. In the beginning, the airline did not offer regularly scheduled services; instead it offered transportation for oil company workers, but soon thereafter more DC-3s were purchased and the airline received a number of Fokker F27s, and regularly scheduled flights to Singapore, Kuala Lumpur and Manila were begun. The name Sempati was taken from Sampati, a mythical bird in Hindu mythology. In its early days, Sempati were referred by some people as "Sembilan Panglima Tinggi" (nine senior commanders) the Indonesian Army Strategic Reserve Command was also involved in its operations.

In 1975, a Boeing 707 was leased from Pelita Air for flights between Denpasar and Tokyo but the route was turned over to Garuda Indonesia by the Indonesian government. After 1977, the DC-3s were phased out in favor of the newer, more modern F27s. After this, the airline was unable to acquire other types of aircraft as the government placed restrictions on private airlines buying new equipment and it was not until the mid-to-late 1980s that the Fokker 100 and the Boeing 737-200 were introduced into the fleet.

In the late 1980s, Tommy Suharto purchased Sempati and distributed it among three investors: Tri Utama Bhakti, Humpuss and Nusantara Ampera Bhakti (Nusamba).

After the buyout, the airline expanded rapidly in the early 1990s. Hasan Soedjono, the CEO of Sempati, planned a five-year leap to achieve the target of becoming one of Southeast Asia's largest airlines after Singapore Airlines, Garuda Indonesia, Malaysia Airlines and Thai Airways International. The airline also had plans to expand into Europe with the introduction of a Jakarta–Abu Dhabi route.

However, financial difficulties soon plagued the airline. Its expansion plans were ruined as it was unable to buy new aircraft such as the Boeing 767 and some others, while Garuda Indonesia, which originally planned to sell its DC-10s to the airline, is backed out, and instead the airline to eventually purchase Airbus A300 aircraft from Pan Am. With the introduction of the A300, the airline soon began commercial services to new destinations in Asia and Australia.

In 1994, the airline changed its name to Sempati Air. The airline was the launch customer of the Fokker 70. In 1996, just as the airline was planning a share flotation, its debt became known and it was listed in the Red Category, a sign of too much debt. Following continued financial problems, some aircraft were sold or returned to lessors, but it was too late to save the airline and operations ceased in 1998. 7 years later after it ceased operations, the airline filed for bankruptcy in July 2005.

Until 1998, Sempati Air flew to a wide variety of destinations, including Jakarta, Bandung, Semarang, Solo, Yogyakarta, Surabaya, Denpasar, Mataram, Singapore, Kupang, Dili, Medan, Padang, Pekanbaru, Batam, Tanjung Pinang, Palangkaraya, Banjarmasin, Balikpapan, Tarakan, Manado, Palu, Kendari, Makassar, Ambon, Jayapura, Timika, and Perth (Western Australia).

Historical fleet

Incidents and Accidents 
In 1990, a Sempati Fokker F27, registered as PK-JFF crashed in Surabaya when used on a training flight. This flight did not carry any passengers.
In 1997, Sempati Air Flight 304, a Fokker F27 leased from Trigana Air Service crashed into a densely populated neighborhood of Margahayu shortly after takeoff from Bandung's Husein Sastranegara International Airport. A total of 28 people were killed. The pilot lost stability after one of the aircraft's engines failed.
On 16 January 1995, a Sempati Air Boeing 737-200, registered as PK-JHF with Nosename "Pink Rose", experienced a skid at Adisucipto International Airport. There were no fatalities in this accident, although the plane was written off and scrapped.

References

External links 

Sempati Air Route Map
Airliners Net photos
Fleet Details at Planespotters.net
Timetable images
Accident Incident reports

Defunct airlines of Indonesia
Airlines established in 1968
Airlines disestablished in 1998
Indonesian companies established in 1968
1998 disestablishments in Indonesia